Caeneressa longipennis is a moth of the family Erebidae. It was described by Francis Walker in 1862. It is found on Borneo. The habitat consists of lowland areas.

References

Syntomini
Moths described in 1862